The Pindal Electric Tramway is a small privately owned tramway operating on  gauge in Oakville, Ontario, Canada.

History
Owned by Canadian animator Kaj Pindal, the tramway opened in 1965 in Montreal, but moved to Oakville in 1980. The line is powered by overhead electric cables, with the power transmitted to the tramcars via pantograph, which is also highly unusual in the  gauge. Although few private homes are able to accommodate a railway of  gauge, the Pindal Electric Tramway operates, by agreement with the City of Oakville, partly on Pindal's private property, and partly on land owned by the city.

Rolling stock
The Pindal Electric Tramway operates a fleet of seven scale electric tramcars, and several passenger trailers, as well as a small number of flatbed and freight trailers.

References

15 in gauge railways